

The Donnet-Denhaut flying boat was a maritime patrol and anti-submarine warfare aircraft produced in France during the First World War. Known at the time simply as "Donnet-Denhaut" or "DD" flying boats, the DD-2, DD-8, DD-9, and DD-10 designations were applied retrospectively to denote the various changes in configuration made during their service life.

Design and development
Developed in response to a French Navy requirement, these were biplane flying boats of conventional configuration with two-bay unstaggered wings, and a Salmson R9 160 hp radial engine, mounted pusher-fashion on struts in the interplane gap. The French Navy ordered some 90 aircraft in this original configuration (later dubbed DD-2), and in 1917, requested Donnet-Denhaut to redesign the aircraft to take advantage of the new Hispano-Suiza 8 engine. So equipped, the Navy ordered another 365 machines. In order to take full advantage of the more powerful engine, Donnet-Denhaut increased the wingspan by adding a third bay to the wing cellule and used the extra lift to incorporate a place for a second gunner, bringing the total crew to three. This version (later, the DD-8) became the most produced, with perhaps 500 aircraft built. The DD-8 was also known as the Donnet-Denhaut 300-hp.

Further developments added a second machine gun to each gunner's station (the DD-9) and twin engines mounted in a push-pull configuration (the DD-10). Following the war, a few military surplus DDs were remanufactured as the Donnet HB.3 and operated commercially for a time.

Operational history
Apart from French Navy service, DD flying boats were operated by the United States Navy in Europe, flying from Île-Tudy and Dunkirk to protect convoys from submarines. Some 50 aircraft of this type were purchased, and the first attack (against U-108; unsuccessful) took place on 23 April 1918.

Operators

French Navy

Portuguese Naval Aviation

United States Navy

Specifications (DD-8)

See also

Notes

References

 
 
 
 
 

1910s French patrol aircraft
Flying boats
Biplanes
Single-engined pusher aircraft
Donnet aircraft
Aircraft first flown in 1915